Makante Achan is a 2009 Indian Malayalam-language comedy drama film directed by V. M. Vinu, written by Samjad Narayanan, and produced by Seven Arts International. It stars Sreenivasan, Vineeth Sreenivasan, and Suhasini in lead roles, with Salim Kumar, Bindu Panicker, and Jagathy Sreekumar in supporting roles.

Plot
Viswanathan is a village officer. He wants to make his son Manu, an engineer. But Manu wants to become a singer. Viswanathan sends him to a coaching centre where KC Francis is the principal. KC Francis is a very strict principal he watches every child through CCTV cameras. Manu often felt it is like a torture but he suffers all the strict principles. Manu often tells his mother to allow him to go and participate in reality TV shows. But Viswanathan doesn't agree with it. In this time, a fake sanyasi Himaval Swami starts an Asram in their village. Viswanathan didn't believed in such Godmans. Krishnankutty, Viswanathan's friend and his wife Santhanavally visit this sanyasi for blessing to get a child. But Santhanavally faced a bad experience from the sanyasi. Some disciples of Himaval Swami visited Viswanathan for a sanction of a project in a 90 acres. But Viswanathan realised some illegal issues in the project so that he didn't give sanction to the project.
 
When the entrance exam results come, Manu fails. Viswanathan calls him a cheat and slaps him. Manu leaves his house. After two days Viswanathan finds out that Manu is working as a waiter in a hotel. Viswanathan's heart is broken and he becomes a drunkard. But Manu also participates in a reality show. Once when he returned home, Himaval Swami attacked him as he didn't sanction the project. Family found Viswanathan on a hospital. viswanathan gave police 
a correct statement and police arrested Himaval Swami. Some people under control of Krishnankutty put fire on Asram.

Before the final stage Manu and Viswanathan reunite and he wins the first prize in the reality show.

Cast
Sreenivasan as Viswanathan, a village officer
Vineeth Sreenivasan as Manu Viswanathan
Suhasini as Rema, Viswanathan's wife
Salim Kumar as Krishnan Kutty
Bindu Panicker as Renuka, Krishnankutty's wife
Jagathy Sreekumar as Himaval Swami
Janardhanan as Kurup
Thilakan as K. C. Francis
Suresh Krishna as Police Officer 
Varada as Ann
Revathy Sivakumar as Manu's sister
Augustine
Sreelatha Namboothiri as Kurup's Wife
Sharreth as himself (cameo)
Ouseppachan as himself (cameo)
Chitra Iyer as herself (cameo)
Sreekala Sasidharan as herself (archived footage)

Soundtrack
"Ee Vennilavint" - Vineeth Sreenivasan
"Himaval Swami" - Kavalam Sreekumar
"Othorumichoru" - Vineeth Sreenivasan

Reception
The film was a commercial success at the box office and was one of the highest-grossing Malayalam films of that year. Sreenivasan won the Asianet Film Award for Best Supporting Actor for the film.

References

External links

2009 films
2009 comedy-drama films
2000s Malayalam-language films
Films directed by V. M. Vinu
2009 comedy films
2009 drama films
Indian comedy-drama films
Indian family films
Films shot in Palakkad
Films scored by M. Jayachandran